Terribacillus goriensis is a Gram-positive, moderately halotolerant, strictly aerobic, rod-shaped and motile bacterium from the genus of Terribacillus which has been isolated from sea water from Busan in Korea.

References

External links 
Type strain of Terribacillus goriensis at BacDive -  the Bacterial Diversity Metadatabase

 

Bacillaceae
Bacteria described in 2007